Bucklige Welt may refer to:

 Bucklige Welt, a low mountain and hill region in Lower Austria on the edge of the Alps
 Oberbergischer Kreis, a county in the Bergisches Land region of North Rhine-Westphalia, Germany